Guru Chenganoor Raman Pillai, also spelt Chengannur Raman Pillai (1886–1980), was a celebrated Kathakali artist from Kerala in south India. He was known for his brilliant portrayal of the anti-heroic Kathi roles on stage, and was the head of palace kathakali yogam to the Travancore Maharaja in a career spanning almost 65 years.

Raman Pillai, born in Chenganoor on 16 January 1886, was a specialist in the Kathakali southern style called Kapplingad, which gives prominence to abhinaya (acting). He wrote Thekkan Chittayilulla Abhyasa Kramangal, considered one of the major training manuals on southern-style Kathakali.

He was a disciple of Thakazhi Kesava Panikker, Mathur Kunhupilla Panikker and Ambalappuzha Kunhikrishna Panikker. Another Kathakali master, Chennthala Kochupillai Panikker, helped him to gain popularity in his art.

Raman Pillai had his masterpieces in roles like Duryodhanan, Ravanan and Keechakan, Jarasandhan, Banan and Kamsan. He also performed as Hanuman, Hamsam and the black-bearded Kaatalan (woodsman).

Raman Pillai's leading disciples include Madavoor Vasudevan Nair, Haripad Ramakrishna Pillai, Mankompu Sivasankara Pillai, Guru Gopinath, and Chennithala Chellappan Pillai. They all studied under him as per the Gurukula system.

The documentary film Chenganoor Raman Pillai profiles his life and contributions. He died on 11 November 1980.

Awards and honours 
 1962 – Kerala Sangeetha Nataka Akademi Award
 1963 – Sangeet Natak Akademi Award
 1971 – Padma Shri
 1975 – Kerala Sangeetha Nataka Akademi Fellowship

Books 
Thekkan Chittayilulla Abhyasa Kramangal published in 1973.

References 

Indian male dancers
Male actors from Kerala
20th-century Indian male actors
1886 births
1980 deaths
Malayali people
Kathakali exponents
People from Alappuzha district
Performers of Indian classical dance
Dancers from Kerala
Recipients of the Padma Shri in arts
20th-century Indian dancers
19th-century Indian dancers
Recipients of the Sangeet Natak Akademi Award
Recipients of the Kerala Sangeetha Nataka Akademi Fellowship
Recipients of the Kerala Sangeetha Nataka Akademi Award